Atromitos Achaea F.C. is a Greek football club, based in Patras, Achaea.

The club was founded in 1964. They will play in Football League 2 for the season 2013-14.

History
Established as Atromitos Lappa F.C. and had a significant presence, especially in the 1970s at regional Achaean league. Started from the third regional Achaean league reached for the first time first regional Achaean league at the period 1969-1970. It played until 1973 to participate once again in 1977 until 1986, returned again in 1990-91 season without success and again in 1993-94 until 1996-97 season.

The 2005-06 became Achaean Champions. Participate in Delta Ethniki during the periods 2006-07, 2007–08, 2008–09, 2009–10, 2010–11, 2011–12 and 2012–13 .

The season 2012-13 finished 2nd at the 6th Group Of Delta Ethniki and  will play in Football League 2 for the season 2013-14. Also the name of the club changed from Atromitos Lappa F.C. to Atromitos Achaea F.C. and the transferred from Lappa to Patras

Honors

Domestic Titles and honors
 Achaea Champions: 1
 2005-06
 Achaea Cup Winners: 2
 2009-10, 2012–13

Football clubs in Western Greece